The Maxwell Land Grant, also known as the Beaubien-Miranda Land Grant, was a  Mexican land grant in Colfax County, New Mexico, and part of adjoining Las Animas County, Colorado. This 1841 land grant was one of the largest contiguous private landholdings in the history of the United States. The New Mexico towns of Cimarron, Colfax, Dawson, Elizabethtown, French, Lynn, Maxwell, Miami, Raton, Rayado, Springer, Ute Park and Vermejo Park came to be located within the grant, as well as numerous other towns that are now ghost towns.

History

Early days
The lands covered in the Maxwell Land Grant were originally tribal lands belonging to Jicarilla Apache Indians. In 1885, Helen Hunt Jackson's report for the Bureau of Indian Affairs reported the Jicarilla Apaches numbered 850 at Cimarron Agency, upon what is called "Maxwell's Grant" in northeastern New Mexico. In 1821, the government of Mexico was established, and the new government retained the Spanish policy of encouraging settlement by making land grants.

Beaubien and Miranda
Carlos Beaubien was a French-Canadian trapper who became a Mexican citizen. His partner, Guadalupe Miranda, was the secretary to Governor Manuel Armijo in Santa Fe. On January 8, 1841, Beaubien and Miranda petitioned Armijo for a land grant. They had to swear that they would colonize and cultivate the land. Three days later, Armijo granted them the land on the condition that they put it to good use. However, Beaubien and Miranda failed to prove up the grant for the next two years. On February 13, 1843, they asked the justice of the peace in Taos to sign an order promising them possession of the land. The justice affirmed that he had marked the boundaries of the grant and that Beaubien and Miranda were in full possession of the land grant.

Lucien B. Maxwell
Lucien Bonaparte Maxwell was a pioneer, explorer and adventurer who married Luz Beaubien, the daughter of Carlos Beaubien. Beaubien hired Maxwell to manage his interests, and Maxwell and his wife settled in Rayado, New Mexico, in 1849. In 1860, Maxwell built a large home in Cimarron, a stop on the Mountain Branch of the Santa Fe Trail.

Lucient was well respected and admired by tribes and settlers.   Upon the US declaring war against Mexico, hostilities broke out on his land.  His business partner, a Mexican national, ceded his portion of the land grant to Maxwell and fled to Mexico.  Maxwell's business acumen and relationships with the tribes and settlers are largely why the Mexican American War had so few casualties.

Maxwell was beloved and caring.  An example of his good nature is Delvina Maxwell, an Apache girl he saved as a child.  Legend tells that Utes had conquered Delvina's tribe and taken her as a concubine.  These Utes traveled through Maxwell's ranch in the Cimarron Valley.  Upon seeing the Utes cruelly and viciously beat Delvina, he offered to purchase the young Apache girl.  He struck a bargain for two bulls and a goat, and he later adopted Delvina.  Delvina Maxwell would care for several of Maxwell's children and grandchildren.

Maxwell's land grant was stolen by the United States to give to the railroads, and that theft was aided by his crooked attorney, Springer, whom the town of Springer, New Mexico, is named for.  After misrepresenting Maxwell's interests as his attorney and helping the government cease his land grant through eminent domain, Springer was given land on either side of the railroad as payment for his service misrepresenting and deceiving Lucient Maxwell.

English control
In 1870, for reasons that are not clear, Maxwell decided to sell the grant. A group of financiers, representing an English syndicate, purchased the grant for a reported price of $1,350,000. Maxwell moved to Santa Fe, and then to Fort Sumner, where he died in 1875.

The new owners formed the Maxwell Land Grant and Railway Company. They attempted to remove the squatters from the grant. Some of the squatters felt that they had Maxwell's unwritten permission to live on the grant. Many people left, but some stayed and fought. This struggle between owners and squatters came to be called the Colfax County War. F.J. Tolby, a minister sympathetic to the squatters, was murdered on September 14, 1875.

Dutch control
The English company was bankrupt by 1874, and it went into foreclosure in 1879. A new group of owners from the Netherlands formed the Maxwell Land Grant Company and traveled to Cimarron in 1883, dismissing Frank R. Sherwin and installing future senator and Secretary of War Stephen Benton Elkins as president. In 1885, the new owners convinced the territorial governor Lionel Allen Sheldon to use the National Guard to suppress the squatters.

Because of a variety of financial problems, the Dutch company went bankrupt in 1888. In the early 1880s, the United States sued the company for making claims of lands in the public domain in Colorado. In 1887, this case reached the US Supreme Court, and was decided as United States v. Maxwell Land Grant Company. The court decision affirmed the company's ownership of the land. At this point, the settlers and squatters realized that they could not obtain good title to the land, and most of them left.

Early land sales
In 1867, Lucien Maxwell sold what he thought was a  claim to J.B. Dawson. When Dawson had the land surveyed, it turned out to be  underlain by coal. Phelps Dodge bought the Dawson Homestead and underlying coal in 1906. The company named the town Dawson, and it grew to have about 2,000 people.

Colorado struggle and sale
The struggles over the grant continued, especially in the Colorado portion of the grant, where quite a bit of homesteading had taken place. On August 25, 1888, there was a violent incident at Stonewall, Colorado, in which several people were killed. The Maxwell Land Grant Company continued to sue homesteaders, and in many cases made them pay for their homesteads a second time.  In 1894, the US Supreme Court decided Russell v. Maxwell Land Grant Company, which completely rejected the homesteaders' claims in favor of the company.

Vermejo Park and Valle Vidal
Many other sales of lands in the grant took place in the early 1900s.

In 1902, William Bartlett, a wealthy grain operator from Chicago, bought  of the grant along the drainage of the Vermejo River. Under the agreement, he withheld part of the last payment until the Maxwell Land Grant Company evicted the last of the squatters. In his words, "They are given two years to get the Mexicans off and I hold back $10,000." Bartlett's Vermejo Park portion of the grant has passed through several owners during the twentieth century. Pennzoil bought the Vermejo Park Ranch in 1973 and expanded its size. In 1982, Pennzoil donated a  portion of the ranch known as Valle Vidal to the US government. This area is managed as a wilderness by the US Forest Service. In 1992, Ted Turner bought Vermejo Park Ranch ( from Pennzoil. Turner did not buy the mineral rights, so Atlas Energy Group produces gas on the ranch, while Turner raises buffalo and operates a lodge for wildlife tours, trout fishing and hunting. In 2016 he restored Casa Grande, the mansion built by Bartlett, and now rents rooms there to guests.

Current use

Philmont
Beginning in 1922, Waite Phillips, an oilman from Tulsa, Oklahoma, also assembled a block of land on the Maxwell Land Grant. In two separate gifts in 1938 and 1941, Phillips donated  as a wilderness camping area for the Boy Scouts of America.

In 1963, Norton Clapp, an officer of the National Council of the Boy Scouts of America, donated another piece of the Maxwell Land Grant to Philmont.

Chase Ranch
In 1866, Manley M. Chase purchased a one-third interest in John B. Dawson's ranch (part of the Maxwell Land Grant) on the Vermejo River, forming Chase Ranch. Chase raised both sheep and cattle. In 1871, Chase purchased another part of the original Maxwell grant. He paid 50 cents an acre for  along Poñil Creek, an area which included the old Kit Carson homestead. The two-story adobe house which he built about three miles northeast of Cimarron is still the ranch headquarters and the family home.

Other important parcels
Cimarron Canyon State Park extends along Cimarron Canyon from Eagle Nest Lake to Ute Park and along U.S. Route 64. The park is part of the Colin Neblett State Wildlife Area, which consists of  acres of former grant land. This area was purchased by the state of New Mexico in the early 1950s.

The Whittington Center, founded in 1973, is the largest shooting and hunting complex in the world.

Supreme Court cases
Five cases involving the land grant went to the United States Supreme Court:

Maxwell Land-Grant Case, 121 U.S. 325 (1887) 
Maxwell Land-Grant Case, 122 U.S. 365 (1887) 
Interstate Land Co. v. Maxwell Land Grant Co., 139 U.S. 569 (1891)
Maxwell Land Grant Co. v. Dawson, 151 U.S. 586 (1894) 
Russell v. Maxwell Land Grant Co., 158 U.S. 253 (1895) 
Thompson v. Maxwell Land Grant & R. Co., 168 U.S. 451 (1897)

References

Further reading

History of Colfax County, New Mexico
History of Colorado
Colonial New Mexico
Las Animas County, Colorado
Philmont Scout Ranch
Land grants
Squatting in the United States